This is the discography for Australian electronic music duo Nervo.

Albums

Singles

As lead artist

As featured artist

Guest appearances

Remixes 
2010
 Delerium featuring Kreesha Turner – "Dust in Gravity" (Nervo Radio Edit)
 Sérgio Mendes – "Mas Que Nada" (Nervo Club Remix)

2011
 Katy Perry – "California Gurls" (Nervo Remix)
 Kylie Minogue – "Put Your Hands Up (If You Feel Love)" (Nervo Hands Up Extended Club Mix)

2012
 Namie Amuro – "Let's Go" (Nervo Remix)

2013
 Beyoncé – "Grown Woman" (Nervo Remix)

2014
 Cyndi Lauper – "Time After Time" (Nervo Back in Time Remix)

2020
 Cyn - "Drinks" (Nervo Remix)
 Anabel Englund - "Picture Us" (Nervo Remix)

Songwriting discography

References 

Discographies of Australian artists
Electronic music discographies